David Dvořáček (born June 4, 1992) is a Czech professional ice hockey player. He is currently playing for HC Sparta Praha of the Czech Extraliga.

Dvořáček made his Czech Extraliga debut playing with HC Sparta Praha during the 2014-15 Czech Extraliga season. He also played two games in the SM-liiga for Tappara during the 2010–11 season.

References

External links

1992 births
Living people
Czech ice hockey forwards
AZ Havířov players
BK Havlíčkův Brod players
SHK Hodonín players
KLH Vajgar Jindřichův Hradec players
Rytíři Kladno players
HC Sparta Praha players
HC Stadion Litoměřice players
Tappara players

Ice hockey people from Brno
Czech expatriate ice hockey players in Finland